Michael Sackler-Berner (born October 12, 1983) is an American songwriter, recording artist, guitarist, singer and actor.

Early life
Sackler-Berner was born in New York City. He began playing guitar and songwriting at the age of 11, playing in numerous bands throughout his teen years. He attended McGill University for Music Technology. Sackler-Berner's first professional band was Hearts of Palm, based in Montreal, Quebec. After releasing a full-length album the band had national television licenses on NBC and CBS, and two regional tours. Their final performance was at the international Live 8 festival in 2005.

Solo career

Sackler-Berner performed solo concerts in Greenwich Village, New York City from 2006 to 2009.  His debut album, "MSB," was released in 2010.  "MSB" was produced by Bob Thiele Jr., and featured contributions from longtime Bob Dylan bandmates Jim Keltner and David Mansfield.  Songs from "MSB" went on to be licensed over 30 times on cable and network television programs including FX's Sons of Anarchy, and NBC's Law and Order. Sackler-Berner was then signed to Razor and Tie Music Publishing in 2013.

Sackler-Berner performs regularly at Joe's Pub at The New York Public Theater, as well as other clubs around the Tri State Area.

After the release of "MSB," Sackler-Berner recorded the following recordings:

2011 – Shimmer and Shine – Produced by David Kahne.

2013 – Let Love Be – Produced by Steve Jordan.

2015 – Fragile Magic – Produced by Leo Sidran.

2015 – The Beginning End and in Between – Produced by Marshall Crenshaw and Stewart Lerman.

2017 – Accounting for Taste – Produced by Leo Sidran.

2018 – Short Stories – Produced by Joel Hamilton

The Slim Kings
Sackler-Berner founded rock band The Slim Kings in 2013 with drummer Liberty DeVitto. The band has released three albums, "Fresh Socks," "Expensive Habits," and "The King's County Classic."  The Slim Kings have toured alongside ZZ Top, Los Lonely Boys, Southside Johnny and The Asbury Jukes, The Spin Doctors, and other headliners.  They have had music featured in over a dozen television programs including Netflix's Bloodline, Showtime's Nurse Jackie, NBC's Chicago Fire, and Lifetime's Army Wives.

Family
Sackler-Berner is the son of Elizabeth Sackler and television and film producer Fred Berner. He is the grandson of Milton Berner and Arthur M. Sackler.

Acting

Sackler-Berner has had television roles on Law & Order and Law and Order: Criminal Intent.  He also had small roles in the Disney feature film, Straight Talk, and HBO film, A Dog Year.

References

External links
Artist website
Artist website

1983 births
Living people
Musicians from New York City
Jewish American male actors
Jewish American musicians
Sackler family